Alfred Washburn Benson, also known as Albert Washburn Benson (July 15, 1843January 1, 1916) was an American attorney, politician, and jurist who served as a United States senator from Kansas.

Early life and education 
Born in Poland, Chautauqua County, New York, Benon moved to Jamestown, New York, in 1860, and attended Jamestown and Randolph Academies.

Career 
During the Civil War, he enlisted in 1862 as a private in the 154th New York Infantry Regiment, and at the close of the war held a commission as major.

He studied law, and was admitted to the bar in Buffalo, New York, in 1866 and commenced practice in Sherman, New York. He moved to Ottawa, Kansas, in 1869, held various local offices, and was a member of the Kansas Senate from 1881 to 1885.

He was a judge of the fourth judicial district of Kansas from 1885 to 1897, and was appointed as a Republican to the U.S. Senate to fill the vacancy caused by the resignation of Joseph R. Burton; he served from June 11, 1906, to January 23, 1907, when a successor was elected.

He was an unsuccessful candidate for election in 1907 to fill this vacancy, and was appointed and subsequently elected associate justice of the Kansas Supreme Court, on which he served from 1907 to 1915, when he resigned.

Personal life 
He retired from public life and died in Topeka in 1916, aged 72. Interment was in Highland Cemetery, Ottawa, Kansas.

References

1843 births
1916 deaths
Kansas state court judges
Republican Party Kansas state senators
Politicians from Buffalo, New York
Politicians from Jamestown, New York
People from Ottawa, Kansas
Justices of the Kansas Supreme Court
Republican Party United States senators from Kansas
People from Chautauqua County, New York
19th-century American judges
Union Army officers